Lorenzo Evans (6 March 1878 – 6 February 1945) was an English professional footballer. An outside left, he played in the Football League for Blackburn Rovers, Glossop North End and Blackpool.

He later worked as an architect and surveyor.

References

1878 births
1945 deaths
Footballers from Preston, Lancashire
Blackburn Rovers F.C. players
Blackpool F.C. players
Association football outside forwards
English footballers
Glossop North End A.F.C. players
English Football League players